Follow Me into Madness is the second album by Finnish metal band Tarot, released in 1988 by Bluelight Records. A remastered version was released in 2006 by Spinefarm Records. Rose On The Grave was released as a single in 1988. This is also the last album with Mako H., as he is replaced by Janne Tolsa, the current keyboard player.

Track listing
All music written by Marko and Zachary Hietala, all lyrics by Marko Hietala.

Side one
"Descendants of Power" – 3:50
"Rose on the Grave" – 4:31
"Lady Deceiver" – 3:38
"Follow Me into Madness" – 5:40
"Blood Runs Cold"/"Happy End" – 3:52

Side two
"No Return" – 4:30
"I Don't Care Anymore" – 3:48
"Breathing Fire" – 3:12
"I Spit Venom" – 3:14
"Shadow in My Heart" – 5:34

Remastered CD edition bonus tracks 
"I Don't Care Anymore" (1995 Version) – 4:09
"Shadows in My Heart" (live) – 6:45
"Descendants of Power" (live) – 3:30
"In My Blood" (demo) – 4:00
"Born into the Flame" (demo) – 4:00

Personnel
Tarot
Marko Hietala – vocals, bass
Zachary Hietala – guitars
Mako H – guitars
Pecu Cinnari – drums

Production
Dan Tigerstedt – engineer, mixing
Kassu Halonen – executive producer
Mika Myyryläinen – reissue producer with Tarot
Janne Tolsa – reissue producer, bonus track engineer and mixing
Mikko Tegelman – bonus track engineer and mixing
Mikko Karmila – bonus track engineer

References

1988 albums
Tarot (band) albums